Madrid Delicias railway station may refer to:
 Delicias railway station, opened 1996
 The former Delicias railway station, now the Railway Museum (Madrid)